The 2014 United States House of Representatives elections in Arizona were held on Tuesday, November 4, 2014 to elect the nine U.S. representatives from the state of Arizona, one from each of the state's nine congressional districts, with Democratic and Republican primaries taking place on August 26. The elections coincided with the elections of other federal and state offices, including governor of Arizona.

Overview
The table below shows the total number and percentage of votes, as well as the number of seats gained and lost by each political party in the election for the United States House of Representatives in Arizona. In addition, the voter turnout and the number of votes not valid are listed below.

By district
Results of the 2014 United States House of Representatives elections in Arizona by district:

District 1

Democratic primary
Democrat Ann Kirkpatrick won election to the House of Representatives in 2012. She faced no formal opposition in the Democratic primary. She had previously served in this district from 2007 to 2009.

Results

Republican primary

Candidates
Adam Kwasman, a Republican member of the Arizona House of Representatives, ran. Also running were rancher Gary Kiehne and Arizona House of Representatives Speaker Andy Tobin.

Pinal County Sheriff Paul Babeu briefly ran for the 4th congressional district in 2012, before dropping out after it emerged that he had threatened to deport his gay lover if he outed Babeu as homosexual. He was speculated to run against Kirkpatrick in 2014, but he declined to do so.

Polling

Results

General election

Polling

Results

District 2

Democratic primary
Democrat Ron Barber was elected to a full term in the House of Representatives in 2012, narrowly defeating Republican Martha McSally.

Results

Republican primary
McSally filed to run against Barber again in 2014. Also running for the Republican nomination were Shelley Kais and Chuck Wooten.

Results

General election

Polling

Results
As the election margin was less than 1% in favor of McSally, a recount began on December 3, 2014. McSally won the recount by 161 votes.

District 3

Democrat Raúl Grijalva has represented the district since being elected in 2002.

Republican Gabriela Saucedo Mercer and Libertarian Miguel Olivas also ran.

Democratic primary

Republican primary

General election

Results

District 4

Republican Paul Gosar has represented the district since being elected in 2010.

Democrat Mike Weisser ran against him.

Republican primary

Democratic primary

Libertarian primary

General election

Results

District 5

Republican Matt Salmon has represented the district since being elected in 2012.

He was challenged by Democrat James Woods. Woods was looking to make history as the first openly atheist candidate to be elected to the U.S. Congress (former California Congressman Pete Stark, who served from 1973 to 2013, is an atheist but did not reveal this until 2007; former Massachusetts Congressman Barney Frank revealed that he was an atheist after he left office).

Republican primary

Democratic primary

General election

Results

District 6

Republican David Schweikert has represented the district since being elected in 2010.

Democrat John W. Williamson ran against him.

Republican primary

Democratic primary

General election

Results

District 7

The 7th district is heavily Hispanic. It is located primarily in Phoenix, and includes portions of Glendale and the town of Guadalupe. The incumbent was Democrat Ed Pastor, who had represented the district since 2013, and previously represented the 4th district from 2003 to 2013 and the 2nd district from 1991 to 2013. He was re-elected with 82% of the vote in 2012 and the district has a PVI of D+16. Pastor did not run for re-election.

Democratic primary
Pastor's retirement presented a "once- or twice-in-a-lifetime opportunity" for an open safe Democratic seat in Arizona and was predicted to set off a "free-for-all" in the primary that could "eclipse" the 10-candidate primary for retiring Congressman John Shadegg's seat in 2010. Because of this and Arizona's "resign-to-run" law, political consultant Mario Diaz predicted a "domino effect, from federal (offices) all the way down to city (councils)."

Candidates
Declared
 Randy Camacho
 Ruben Gallego, former state representative
 Jarrett Maupin, pastor and activist
 Johnnie Robinson
 Mary Rose Wilcox, Maricopa County Supervisor

Withdrew
 Steve Gallardo, state senator (running for Wilcox's place on the Maricopa County Board of Supervisors)

Removed from ballot
 Cesar Chavez, formerly Scott Fistler, Republican write-in candidate for the seat in 2012 and candidate for Phoenix City Council in 2013

Declined
 Chad Campbell, Minority Leader of the Arizona House of Representatives
 Ronnie Cho, former Associate Director of the White House Office of Public Engagement and Intergovernmental Affairs
 Phil Gordon, former mayor of Phoenix
 Catherine Miranda, state representative
 Michael Nowakowski, Phoenix City Councilman
 Ed Pastor, incumbent U.S. Representative
 Laura Pastor, Phoenix City Councilwoman and daughter of Ed Pastor
 Marie Lopez Rogers, Mayor of Avondale
 Greg Stanton, Mayor of Phoenix
 Kyrsten Sinema, U.S. Representative (running for re-election in the 9th district)
 Anna Tovar, Minority Leader of the Arizona Senate
 Daniel Valenzuela, Phoenix City Councilman

Polling

Results

Republican primary

Withdrew
 Brianna Wasserman

Results

Libertarian primary

Candidates
Declared
 Joe Cobb

Withdrew
 Ted Rogers

Results

Americans Elect primary

Candidates
Declared
 Joe Cobb

Withdrew
 Ted Rogers

Results

General election

Results

District 8

Republican Trent Franks has represented the district since being elected in 2002.

Clair Van Steenwyk ran against him in the Republican primary. No Democrat filed to run.

Republican primary

Americans Elect primary

General election

Results

District 9

Democrat Kyrsten Sinema won election to the House of Representatives in 2012, when the district was created.

Democratic primary

Candidates
Declared
 Kyrsten Sinema, incumbent U.S. Representative

Results

Republican primary

Candidates
Declared
 Wendy Rogers, retired United States Air Force Lieutenant Colonel
 Andrew Walter, businessman and retired American football player

Withdrew
 Vernon Parker, former mayor of Paradise Valley and nominee for the seat in 2012 (running for Arizona Corporation Commissioner)

Declined
 Ben Quayle, former U.S. Representative
 Martin Sepulveda, businessman and candidate for the seat in 2012

Polling

Results

Libertarian primary

General election

Results

See also
 2014 United States House of Representatives elections
 2014 United States elections

References

External links
 U.S. House elections in Arizona, 2014 at Ballotpedia
 Campaign contributions at OpenSecrets

Arizona
2014
United States House of Representatives